Grāveri Parish is an administrative unit of Krāslava Municipality. From 2009 until 2021, it was part of the former Aglona Municipality. As of 2013, it has a population of 552 and an area of 65.3 km2. Until 2009, it was a part of the Krāslava District.

Its administrative centre and the largest village is Grāveri, which had a population of 203 in 2009.

References 

Parishes of Latvia
Krāslava Municipality
Latgale